Emir Lokmić (born December 23, 1997) is a male alpine skier from Bosnia and Herzegovina who will compete for Bosnia and Herzegovina at the 2018 Winter Olympics.

Currently, he is skiing for ski club Željezničar from Sarajevo.

References

1997 births
Living people
Sportspeople from Sarajevo
Olympic alpine skiers of Bosnia and Herzegovina
Bosnia and Herzegovina male alpine skiers
Alpine skiers at the 2018 Winter Olympics
Alpine skiers at the 2022 Winter Olympics